Brent J. Grieve (born May 9, 1969) is a Canadian former professional ice hockey left wing and coach. He played 97 games in the National Hockey League with four teams between 1993 and 1996.

Playing career
As a youth, Grieve played in the 1982 Quebec International Pee-Wee Hockey Tournament with a minor ice hockey team from Oshawa.

He was selected in the fourth round of the 1989 NHL Entry Draft, 65th overall, by the New York Islanders and played 97 NHL games with the Islanders, Edmonton Oilers, Chicago Blackhawks and Los Angeles Kings, as well as multiple seasons with various minor league teams.

Post-playing career
Following his retirement, Grieve served as an assistant coach with his hometown Oshawa Generals for the 1997–98 season.

Career statistics

Regular season and playoffs

References

External links
 

1969 births
Living people
Canadian ice hockey left wingers
Cape Breton Oilers players
Capital District Islanders players
Chicago Blackhawks players
Edmonton Oilers players
Ice hockey people from Ontario
Indianapolis Ice players
Kansas City Blades players
Los Angeles Kings players
New York Islanders draft picks
New York Islanders players
Oshawa Generals players
Phoenix Roadrunners (IHL) players
Salt Lake Golden Eagles (IHL) players
Sportspeople from Oshawa